The Redfern DH-2 is an American homebuilt aircraft that was designed by Walter Redfern and produced by the Walter Redfern Company of Post Falls, Idaho, based upon the 1915 Airco DH.2 fighter aircraft. When it was available the aircraft was supplied in the form of plans for amateur construction.

Design and development
The DH-2 features a biplane layout, a single-seat open cockpit, fixed conventional landing gear with and a single engine in pusher configuration.

Unlike the original Geoffrey de Havilland designed DH.2, the replica replaces most of the structural wood with welded steel tubing, with its flying surfaces covered in doped aircraft fabric. The tail is an open lattice structure to fit around the rearwards-facing propeller and is also cable-braced.

The manufacturer estimated the construction time from the supplied plans as 2500 hours.

Operational history
By 1998 the company reported that ten aircraft were completed and flying.

Specifications (DH-2)

References

External links
Photo of a Redfern DH-2 in flight

DH-2
1990s United States sport aircraft
Single-engined pusher aircraft
Biplanes
Homebuilt aircraft
Replica aircraft